Ahmed Al-Sulami (born 11 August 1983) is a Saudi football player who currently plays for Al-Entesar as a full-back.

Honours
Al-Fayha
 Saudi First Division: 2016–17

Abha
MS League: 2018–19

References

1983 births
Living people
Saudi Arabian footballers
Al-Riyadh SC players
Damac FC players
Al-Wehda Club (Mecca) players
Abha Club players
Al-Hazem F.C. players
Ittihad FC players
Al-Fayha FC players
Al-Ain FC (Saudi Arabia) players
Jeddah Club players
Al-Entesar Club players
Saudi First Division League players
Saudi Professional League players
Saudi Second Division players
Association football fullbacks